Morocco–Russia relations are the bilateral relations between Russia and Morocco.

History

Early relations
Bilateral relations between Russia and Morocco have traditionally been very good since the 18th century. Then the mutual relations began with the exchange of goods between the empires of Sultan Mohammed Ben Abdallah and Empress Catherine II.

1890s
In 1897, the Russian Empire established a consulate in Tangier.

1900s
In 1906, Arthur Cassini participated in the Algeciras Conference as the representative of the Russian Empire. The Russian delegation supported the French position unequivocally.

1910s
In the late Tsarist years, Russia supported the French colonial positions on Morocco.

1920s
In the course of the 1920s, the Soviet-sponsored Comintern supported Jacques Doriots (then a communist) campaign against the French colonial presence in Morocco.

Additionally, in the 1920s and the 1930s, the Soviet Union did not sign the Tangier Protocol.

Cold War
During the Cold War, Morocco was one of the Soviet Union's most important trading partners in Africa.

In the early 1960s, Soviet-Moroccan relations were developing very well. During the 1964 Moscow protest, approximately 50 Moroccan students broke into the embassy of Morocco in the Soviet Union in Moscow and staged an all‐day sit-in protesting against death sentences handed down by a Moroccan court in Rabat.

In 1978, the Soviet Union invested heavily in the mining industry of Morocco.

In the context of Western Sahara War, King Hassan II of Morocco said in 1980 that Morocco and the Soviet Union are "at war" in the sense that Soviet arms were supplied to Algeria, which were being shipped by Algeria to the Polisario Front.
Unlike other armed liberation movements in Africa, the Soviet Union did not commit to supporting the POLISARIO Front. The pro-Soviet Party for Progress and Socialism supported the Moroccan government in Western Sahara. Despite the POLISARIO Front's open expectation of Soviet support, the USSR refused to take any stand against Morocco. This might be because Morocco was the largest Soviet trading partner in Africa in 1978.

Current relations

In the 2000s, the bilateral trade relations widened significantly, especially in the mining and agriculture sector.

The current President Vladimir Putin had paid a visit to Morocco in September 2006 in order to boost economic and military ties between Russia and Morocco. Morocco-Russian relations are still in constant development, while trade between the two countries reached over two billion dollars in 2011. In March 2016, King Mohammed VI of Morocco visited Russia and met with President Putin. Both sides signed an agreement on mutual protection of secret information.

After a significant decline in tourism from Europe, the Ministry of Tourism of Morocco is planning to attract more travelers from Russia.

In 2019, the Moroccan and the Russian government agreed on investing into an oil refinery in Mohammedia, that was defunct since 2015. So equipped with a refining capacity of around 100,000 barrels per day, the refinery should later be able to reach 200,000 barrels per day by exploiting the Nador Port facilities. This expansion promises to deliver a number of trickle-down effects, including boosting job creation and infrastructure development, particularly in Morocco's northern regions.

Morocco and the Russia signed a new fisheries cooperation agreement in 2020, after a former agreement signed in 2016, expired in March. The new agreement, spanning 4 years, is the 8th of its kind since 1992, and establishes the legal framework allowing a fleet of 10 Russian vessels to fish for small pelagic species in Moroccan waters beyond 15 nautical miles.

During the coronavirus pandemic, the cooperation between Morocco and the Russian Federation was highlighted after the approval of the Sputnik V vaccine in January 2021.

During Russo-Ukrainian war 
Morocco chose not to participate in the UN vote that condemned the Russian invasion of Ukraine, Morocco said it was concerned about the military escalation in the Ukraine emphasizing that it encourages all initiatives and actions promoting a peaceful settlement of conflicts and 37% of Moroccans want to keep ties with Russia. A former Moroccan prisoner of war who has naturalized Ukrainian citizenship was sentenced to death by a Donetsk People's Republic court.

Diplomatic missions 
Russia has an embassy in Rabat, and a consular office in Casablanca. Morocco is represented in Russia by its embassy to Moscow.

Russian Embassy 
The Russian embassy is located in Rabat.

 Ambassador Valerian Shuvaev

Moroccan Embassy 
The Moroccan embassy is located in Moscow.

 Ambassador Lotfi Bouchaara

See also
 Foreign relations of Russia
 Soviet Union-Africa relations
 Foreign relations of Morocco

References

External links

Documents on the Morocco–Russia relationship from the Russian Ministry of Foreign Affairs 
Embassy of Russia in Rabat (in Arab and French)
Embassy of Morocco in Moscow (in Arab, French and Russian)

 
Africa–Russia relations
Russia
Bilateral relations of Russia